Abdelaziz Barrada (Arabic: عبد العزيز برادة; born 19 June 1989), sometimes known just as Abdel, is a professional footballer who plays as a midfielder. Born in France, he represented Morocco at international level.

Club career

Getafe
Barrada was born in Provins, France. After playing three years with Paris Saint-Germain's reserves, he moved to Spain in 2010 and joined Getafe, initially being assigned to the reserves which were playing for the first time ever in Segunda División B. On 14 March 2011, he signed his first professional contract with the Madrid outskirts club, and proved essential as the B's eventually retained their league status at the end of the season.

On 28 August 2011, Barrada made his La Liga debut with Getafe, starting and playing 60 minutes in a 1–1 home draw against Levante. He was immediately propelled into manager Luís García's starting XI.

Barrada scored his first goal for Getafe's main squad on 6 November 2011, helping the hosts – who played more than 60 minutes with ten players – to a 3–2 home win against Atlético Madrid. In the following month, on the 17th, he netted twice in a 2–1 success at Mallorca.

Barrada scored four goals in 32 matches in both of his seasons with the team, helping it to consecutive midtable positions (11th and tenth).

Al-Jazira and Marseille
On 6 July 2013, Barrada joined UAE Arabian Gulf League side Al Jazira Club, signing a four-year contract. The following summer, he agreed to a four-year deal with Marseille for a reported €4.5 million.

In only his second appearance in Ligue 1, Barrada scored his first goal in the competition, coming on as an 87th-minute substitute in the home fixture against Nice and scoring for a 4–0 victory. His second arrived early into the 2015–16 season, as he contributed to a 6–0 demolition of Troyes also at the Stade Vélodrome.

International career
Barrada earned his first cap for Morocco on 29 February 2012, playing 86 minutes in a 2–0 friendly win over Burkina Faso. Also that year, he was part of the under-23 squad at the Summer Olympic Games, scoring in a 2–2 draw against Honduras in an eventual group stage exit.

International goals

Scores and results list Morocco's goal tally first, score column indicates score after each Barrada goal.

Honours
Morocco U23
CAF U-23 Championship runner-up: 2011

References

External links

1989 births
Living people
People from Provins
French sportspeople of Moroccan descent
Footballers from Seine-et-Marne
French footballers
Moroccan footballers
Association football midfielders
Ligue 1 players
La Liga players
Segunda División players
Segunda División B players
UAE Pro League players
Süper Lig players
Qatar Stars League players
Paris Saint-Germain F.C. players
Olympique de Marseille players
Getafe CF B players
Getafe CF footballers
Gimnàstic de Tarragona footballers
Al Jazira Club players
Al-Nasr SC (Dubai) players
Al-Shahania SC players
Antalyaspor footballers
US Lusitanos Saint-Maur players
Morocco international footballers
2013 Africa Cup of Nations players
2011 CAF U-23 Championship players
Footballers at the 2012 Summer Olympics
Olympic footballers of Morocco
French expatriate footballers
Moroccan expatriate footballers
Expatriate footballers in Spain
Expatriate footballers in the United Arab Emirates
Expatriate footballers in Turkey
Expatriate footballers in Qatar
Moroccan expatriate sportspeople in Spain
Moroccan expatriate sportspeople in the United Arab Emirates
Moroccan expatriate sportspeople in Turkey
Moroccan expatriate sportspeople in Qatar